Martha Isabel Fandiño Pinilla (born Pacho, Colombia, 28 September 1956) is a Colombian and Italian mathematician and author of dual nationality.

Research 

Her research has gained international recognition principally in the following areas:
a) teaching and learning fractions; an epistemological and didactic analysis based on the theory of situations for explaining learning difficulties [Fandiño Pinilla M.I. (2005). Frazioni, aspetti concettuali e didattici. Preface of Athanasios Gagatsis. Bologna: Pitagora. Spanish version: Fandiño Pinilla M.I. (2009). Las fracciones. Aspectos conceptuales y didácticos. Bogotà: Magisterio. Preface to the Spanish edition by Carlos Eduardo Vasco Uribe];
b) analysis of the concept of assessment in the field of Mathematics; a perspective not only pedagogic but, above all, epistemological, sociological, ethical and didactic [Fandiño Pinilla M.I. (2002). Curricolo e valutazione in matematica. Preface of :it:Franco Frabboni. Bologna: Pitagora. Spanish version: Fandiño Pinilla M.I. (2006). Currículo, evaluación y formación docente en matemática. Preface to the Spanish edition by Salvador Llinares. Bogotá: Magisterio];
c) analysis of the different components of the idea of mathematical learning: conceptual, algorithmic, strategic, semiotic and communicative [Fandiño Pinilla M. I. (2008). Molteplici aspetti dell’apprendimento della matematica. Valutare e intervenire in modo mirato e specifico. Preface of Giorgio Bolondi. Trento: Erickson. Spanish version: Fandiño Pinilla M. I. (2010). Múltiples aspectos del aprendizaje de la matemática. Prologue by Giorgio Bolondi. Bogotá: Magisterio];
d) study of difficulties in managing the semiotic transformation of treatment in the process of mathematical teaching and learning [D’Amore B., Fandiño Pinilla M.I. (2007). How the sense of mathematical objects changes when their semiotic representations undergo treatment and conversion. La matematica e la sua didattica. 21, 1, 87–92. Acts of: Joint Meeting of UMI-SIMAI/SMAI-SMF: Mathematics and its Applications. Panel on Didactics of Mathematics. Dipartimento di Matematica, Università di Torino. 6 July 2006].
Her specific areas of research in mathematics education are:
e) Infinity (international research group: Colombia, Italy, Switzerland) [D’Amore B., Arrigo G., Bonilla Estévez M., Fandiño Pinilla M.I., Piatti A., Rojas Garzón P.J., Rodríguez Bejarano J., Romero Cruz J. H., Sbaragli S. (2004). Il “senso dell’infinito”. La matematica e la sua didattica. 4, 46–83. Spanish version: D’Amore B., Arrigo G., Bonilla Estévez, Fandiño Pinilla M.I., Piatti A., Rodríguez Bajarano J., Rojas Garzón P.J., Romero Cruz J.H., Sbaragli S. (2006). El “sentido del infinito”. Epsilon. (Sevilla, Spain), 22, 2, 187–216];
f) Area and perimeter [Fandiño Pinilla M.I., D’Amore B (2006). Area e perimetro. Aspetti concettuali e didattici. Trento: Erickson. Spanish version: Fandiño Pinilla M.I., D’Amore B. (2009). Área y perímetro. Aspectos conceptuales y didácticos. Bogotà: Magisterio. Preface to the Spanish edition by Salvador Llinares];
g) The number zero [D’Amore B., Fandiño Pinilla M.I. (2009). Zero. Aspetti concettuali e didattici. Trento: Erickson. Spanish version: D’Amore B., Fandiño Pinilla M. I. (2012). El número cero. Aspectos historícos, epistemológicos, filosóficos, conceptuales y didácticos del número más misterioso. Bogotá: Magisterio];
h) Competence (international research group: Colombia, Italy, Spain, Switzerland) [D’Amore B., Godino D.J., Arrigo G., Fandiño Pinilla M.I. (2003). Competenze in matematica. Bologna: Pitagora. Spanish version: D’Amore B., Diaz Godino J., Fandiño Pinilla M.I. (2008). Competencias y matemática. Bogotà: Magisterio].
She is member of the NRD (Nucleo di Ricerca in didattica della matematica) within the Dipartimento di Matematica at the Università di Bologna; member of the Scientific panel and for the evaluation of proposals for the Symposium Internacional de Educación Matemática, Chivilcoy, Argentina; member of the panel of referees for the journal RELIME, Cinvestav, México DF., México; member of the editorial panel of the Mediterranean Journal of Mathematics Education, Nicosia, Cyprus; member of the research group MESCUD (Matemáticas Escolares Universidad Distrital) within the Universidad Distrital Francisco José de Caldas, Bogotà, Colombia; member of the Grup de Recerca sobre Analisi Didàctica en Educació Matematica (GRADEM), Barcelona, Spain, xarxa-REMIC de Catalunya; member of the scientific panel of the journal Redipe Virtual, based in Colombia.
From 2000 to 2012 she was research member of the Programmes of Research of National Interest financed by the Università di Bologna and the MIUR (Italian Ministry for Education, Universities and Research).

Personal details and education 
Martha Isabel Fandiño Pinilla was born in Pacho (Cundinamarca, Colombia), and has Colombian and Italian citizenship. She has a degree in Educational Science with major in mathematics, National Pedagogic University (Colombia); specialization in mathematics education (Universidad Distrital Francisco José de Caldas, Bogotà – District University of Bogotá); PhD in mathematics education (Università Filosofo Costantino if Nitra, Slovakia). Her husband is Bruno D'Amore.

Career 
She began her career as a primary school teacher after winning a public competition at the age of 16 and subsequently became a university lecturer first in Colombia (Universidad Distrital Francisco José de Caldas of Bogotà) and then in Italy (Università of Urbino, Bologna and Bolzano) and Switzerland (Alta Scuola Pedagogica di Locarno, then Scuola Universitaria Professionale della Svizzera Italiana di Locarno). She has collaborated and continues to collaborate with many European and South American universities, above all within the sphere of PhD theses, as a member of commissions, holding seminars and supervising theses.
She is consultant to the publisher Giunti of Florence for Mathematics Education; for the Regional Educational Authority of Emilia-Romagna (part of the Ministry of Education, Universities and Research); for the activities of the research group Valermath (Valutazione Emilia-Romagna Matematica); for the Invalsi Commission (Frascati, Rome) within the working group for the development of guidelines for the production of learning assessment materials for Mathematics (2007–08). She is editor of the series Viva la matematica (Carocci Faber ed., Rome) and Matematica per gli insegnanti e per la classe (Armando ed., Rome).
From 2004 she has been joint scientific director of the annual national conference Incontri con la matematica, held in November.
She is author of some 250 books and articles on research in Mathematics Education and on spreading this research within the area of teacher training (published in Italian, French, English, Spanish, Portuguese, Slovak).
She holds frequent seminars and gives research papers and holds teacher training sessions in Italy, France, Spain, Cyprus, Guatemala, Colombia, Argentina, Brazil, Switzerland, Greece, Costa Rica, Dominican Republic, Bolivia, and other Countries.

Awards 
On December 14, 2013, a Cali, during the international symposium on Education and Pedagogy La didactica hoy del REDIPE (Red Iberoamericana de Pedagogía) she was awarded the Mención de honor al mérito pedagógico e investigativo y a la producción intellectual.

External links 
Personal website: http://www.incontriconlamatematica.net/sitoufficialebm/index.php/
Conferences: Incontri con la matematica (Official Conference Website; History of the Conference; *History of Conference Proceedings): http://www.incontriconlamatematica.net/
Mathematics Education Research Group: NRD, Nucleo di Ricerca in Didattica della Matematica, *Università di Bologna: http://www.dm.unibo.it/rsddm
Projects in Mathematics Education: http://www.pitagoragroup.it/pited/pagina.didattica.html
Personal Blog within the website Giunti Scuola:http://www.giuntiscuola.it/lavitascolastica/magazine/a-tu-per-tu-con-l-esperto/

References

1956 births
Living people
20th-century Italian mathematicians
20th-century Colombian mathematicians
20th-century women mathematicians
21st-century Colombian mathematicians
People from Cundinamarca Department